In the 2010–11 season, CR Belouizdad competed in the Ligue 1 for the 45th season, as well as the Algerian Cup.

Squad list
Players and squad numbers last updated on 18 November 2010.Note: Flags indicate national team as has been defined under FIFA eligibility rules. Players may hold more than one non-FIFA nationality.

Competitions

Overview

{| class="wikitable" style="text-align: center"
|-
!rowspan=2|Competition
!colspan=8|Record
!rowspan=2|Started round
!rowspan=2|Final position / round
!rowspan=2|First match	
!rowspan=2|Last match
|-
!
!
!
!
!
!
!
!
|-
| Ligue 1

|  
| 5th
| 25 September 2010
| 8 July 2011
|-
| Algerian Cup

| Round of 64 
| Quarter-final
| 29 December 2010
| 8 April 2011
|-
! Total

Ligue 1

League table

Results summary

Results by round

Matches

Algerian Cup

Squad information

Playing statistics

|-
! colspan=10 style=background:#dcdcdc; text-align:center| Goalkeepers

|-
! colspan=10 style=background:#dcdcdc; text-align:center| Defenders

|-
! colspan=10 style=background:#dcdcdc; text-align:center| Midfielders

|-
! colspan=10 style=background:#dcdcdc; text-align:center| Forwards

|-
! colspan=10 style=background:#dcdcdc; text-align:center| Players transferred out during the season

Goalscorers
Includes all competitive matches. The list is sorted alphabetically by surname when total goals are equal.

Transfers

In

Out

References

External links
 2010–11 CR Belouizdad season at dzfoot.com 

CR Belouizdad seasons
Algerian football clubs 2010–11 season